Günther Roll (born 4 October 1905, date of death unknown) was a German rower. He competed in the men's coxless four event at the 1928 Summer Olympics.

References

1905 births
Year of death missing
German male rowers
Olympic rowers of Germany
Rowers at the 1928 Summer Olympics
Sportspeople from Poznań